Langemark-Poelkapelle is a municipality located in the Belgian province of West Flanders.

Geography
Other places in the municipality include Bikschote, Langemark and Poelkapelle. On January 1, 2006, Langemark-Poelkapelle had a total population of 7,780.

Gallery

See also
 Langemark German war cemetery

References

External links
 
 Official Website 

Municipalities of West Flanders